hHead were a Canadian alternative rock band, formed in 1991 in Ajax.

The band was originally formed by Noah Mintz and Brendan Canning as an acoustic duo, with a rotating succession of drummers rounding out the trio after they evolved into a harder rock band.

They were originally known as Head, but added the second h after discovering that another band was already recording as Head, although both hHead and the Vancouver band Rymes with Orange regularly joked in promotional interviews that the extra h had been traded between the bands by either donation or theft.

The band's first album, Fireman, was released independently in 1992, and became popular on Canadian campus radio. It received wider distribution in 1993, and the band toured Canada both as a headliner in rock clubs and as an opening act for My Bloody Valentine, Sloan, Dinosaur Jr. and Stone Temple Pilots.

In 1993, the band won CFNY-FM's Discovery to Disc contest, which awarded them $100,000 toward the recording of a new album. The band landed a contract with IRS Records in 1994, releasing their second album, Jerk, that year. The album was supported by a large-scale national tour as an opening act for Moist, and by an appearance on the Edgefest bill in 1995. However, IRS Records was at this point in financial trouble, and declared bankruptcy in 1996. The band then moved to the Canadian independent label Handsome Boy Records for their final album, Ozzy.

The band also appeared on at least two compilation albums during their career, with a cover of Bob Snider's "They Oughta Bottle Friday Night" appearing on the 1996 tribute album Poetreason: The Songs of Bob Snider and the non-album track "Want" appearing on both the 1996 and 1998 editions of More of Our Stupid Noise. In 2015, the previously unreleased track "Fempire" and a solo track by Canning titled "Born from the Ashes" appeared on Squirtgun Records' 20th anniversary Return of Our Stupid Noise compilation.

The band broke up in 1997. 

Mintz is now a mastering engineer for artists such as Hayden and The Dears, and has recorded solo material as Noah's Arkweld. Canning joined By Divine Right for that band's third album Bless This Mess, and later formed the bands Broken Social Scene with Kevin Drew and Cookie Duster with Bernard Maiezza. Broken Social Scene's album Bee Hives includes a song titled "hHallmark", alluding to the unique typography of hHead's name.

Members
Noah Mintz - Guitar/Vocals (1991–1997)
Brendan Canning - Bass guitar/Backing vocals (1991–1997)
Jason Ray - Drums (1996–1997)
Mark Bartkiw - Drums (1992–1995)
Roland Rainer  - Drums (1991–1992)
Zak Hanna - Additional Guitar (on Fireman) (1991–1992)

Discography
1991 - Potato E.P. (Self-Release)
1992 — Fireman (re-released 1993)
1994 — Jerk
1996 — Ozzy
2017 - Rare and Odd (1991-1997) (Digital Release)

References

Musical groups established in 1991
Musical groups disestablished in 1997
Musical groups from Toronto
Canadian alternative rock groups
1991 establishments in Ontario
1997 disestablishments in Ontario
I.R.S. Records artists